TC-1 is a camera that was produced by Minolta. It is a compact 35 mm point and shoot camera with G-Rokkor 28mm 3.5 lens. As a new camera it was expensive. It has a high quality lens and body. One uncommon feature is the circular diaphragm. It has received praise for its bokeh (out-of-focus characteristics).

In 1996, the Camera Journal Press Club of Japan awarded the TC-1 with the Camera Grand Prix.

References

External links
Minolta TC-1 Popular Photography review
 

Minolta cameras
Point-and-shoot cameras
135 film cameras